Best of the Best: 20 Years of the Year's Best Science Fiction is a science fiction anthology edited by Gardner Dozois that was published in 2005.  It is a special edition in The Year's Best Science Fiction series.

Contents

The book includes a 5-page foreword by Robert Silverberg, a 3-page preface by Dozois, and 36 stories selected by Dozois from among prior annual editions of The Year's Best Science Fiction. Although it is billed as "20 years" of the year's best science fiction, it was actually edited after the 21st edition of the series, and the editor selected from among all 21 editions. The stories are as follows.

Greg Bear: "Blood Music"
Gene Wolfe: "A Cabin on the Coast"
Lucius Shepard: "Salvador"
Nancy Kress: "Trinity"
Howard Waldrop: "Flying Saucer Rock and Roll"
Bruce Sterling: "Dinner in Audoghast"
Pat Cadigan: "Roadside Rescue"
John Crowley: "Snow"
William Gibson: "The Winter Market"
John Kessel: "The Pure Product"
Eileen Gunn: "Stable Strategies for Middle Management"
Mike Resnick: "Kirinyaga"
Robert Silverberg: "Tales from the Venia Woods"
Terry Bisson: "Bears Discover Fire"
Connie Willis: "Even the Queen"
Robert Reed: "Guest of Honor"
Joe Haldeman: "None So Blind"
Brian Stableford: "Mortimer Gray's History of Death"
Maureen F. McHugh: "The Lincoln Train"
Greg Egan: "Wang's Carpets"
Ursula K. Le Guin: "Coming of Age in Karhide"
Michael Swanwick: "The Dead"
Ian McDonald: "Recording Angel"
Tony Daniel: "A Dry, Quiet War"
William Sanders: "The Undiscovered"
Paul J. McAuley: "Second Skin"
Ted Chiang: "Story of Your Life"
Stephen Baxter: "People Came From Earth"
David Marusek: "The Wedding Album"
James Patrick Kelly: "1016 To 1"
Walter Jon Williams: "Daddy's World"
Steven Utley: "The Real World"
Geoff Ryman: "Have Not Have"
Charles Stross: "Lobsters"
Ian R. MacLeod: "Breathmoss"
Molly Gloss: "Lambing Season"

The UK edition, titled The Mammoth Book of The Best of The Best New SF included three additional stories at the end of the book:

Paolo Bacigalupi: "The Fluted Girl"
Peter F. Hamilton: "Footvote"
Alastair Reynolds: "Zima Blue"

2005 books
The Year's Best Science Fiction anthology series